A ghost is a spirit of a dead person that may appear to the living.

Ghost or Ghosts may also refer to:

People
Ghost (producer), British hip hop producer
Ghost (singer) (born 1974), singer
Shayne Gostisbehere (born 1993), a.k.a. The Ghost, American ice hockey player
Robert Guerrero (born 1983), a.k.a. The Ghost, American boxer
Ivan Moody (born 1980), a.k.a. Ghost, member of Five Finger Death Punch
Kelly Pavlik (born 1982), a.k.a. The Ghost, American boxer
Styles P (born 1974), a.k.a. The Ghost, American rapper
Matt Urban (1919–1995), a.k.a. The Ghost, United States Army Lieutenant Colonel

Arts, entertainment, and media

Fictional entities 
 Ghost (comics), several characters and publications
 Ghost (Dungeons & Dragons)
 Ghost (Hamlet), character from William Shakespeare's play Hamlet
 Ghost (The Matrix), a character in Enter the Matrix
 Ghost, the robotic companion of guardians in Destiny
 Ghost, a character in the novel Lost Souls
 Ghost, a type of Pokémon
 Haunter (Pokémon), a Pokémon known in Japan as Ghost
 Ghosts (Pac-Man), the recurring antagonists in the Pac-Man franchise
 Ghosts, group of Gaunt's Ghosts characters
 Ghosts, type of Terran soldier in StarCraft
 Simon "Ghost" Riley, a character in Call of Duty
 The Ghost, a VCX-100 light freighter from Star Wars: Rebels
 Ghost, the ship of Wolf Larsen in Jack London's novel The Sea-Wolf

Films 
Ghosts (1915 film), silent American film starring Henry B. Walthall
The Ghost (1963 film), Italian horror film
The Ghost (1982 film), German drama film
Ghost (1984 film), Japanese experimental short film
Ghosts… of the Civil Dead, 1988 Australian political suspense film
Ghost (1990 film), American romantic fantasy film
Michael Jackson's Ghosts, 1997 short film
Ghost (1998 film), Iranian film
The Ghost (2004 film), South Korean horror film
Ghosts (2005 film), German drama film
Ghosts (2006 film), British drama film
The Ghost (2008 film), Russian thriller film
The Ghost (2010 film), French-German-British political thriller film
Ghost: In Your Arms Again, 2010 Japanese remake of the 1990 American film Ghost
Ghost (2012 film), Indian horror film
Ghosts, a 2014 film also known as Jessabelle
Ghosts (2014 film), Iranian drama film
Ghost (2015 film), Russian comedy film
Ghost (2019 film), Indian horror thriller film
Ghost (2020 film), British independent film about the first day of freedom for an ex-con
The Ghost (2022 film), 2022 Indian Telugu-language action thriller film

Gaming
Ghost (game), word game
Ghost (video gaming), game feature
GHOSTS (video game), an upcoming game
Call of Duty: Ghosts, a 2013 game in the Call of Duty franchise
Ghost 1.0, video game
Ghosts (board game)
StarCraft: Ghost, indefinitely suspended video game

Literature
Ghost (Reynolds novel), by Jason Reynolds
"Ghost", a story by Larry Niven in Crashlander
Ghost, by John Ringo
Ghosts (Aira novel), 1990 novel by César Aira
Ghosts (Auster novel), by Paul Auster
Ghosts (Banville novel), 1993 novel by Irish writer John Banville
Ghosts (play), by Henrik Ibsen
The Ghost (novel), by Robert Harris
The Ghost, novel series by George Mann
The Ghosts, 1969 novel by Antonia Barber

Music

Groups and labels
Ghost (1984 band), Japanese experimental rock group
Ghost (2004 band), Japanese visual kei rock group
Ghost (production team), Swedish producing and songwriting team
Ghost (Swedish band), rock group
Ghosts (band), British indie/pop group
The Ghost (American band), American punk rock group
The Ghost (Faroese band), electropop duo
Ghost9, South Korean boygroup

Albums
Ghost (soundtrack), to the 1990 film
Ghost (Crack the Sky album), 2001
Ghost (Devin Townsend Project album), 2011
Ghost (Gary Numan album), 1988
Ghost (Ghost album), 1990
Ghost (In Fiction EP), 2007
Ghost (Kate Rusby album), 2014
Ghost (Radical Face album), 2007
Ghost (Sky Ferreira EP), 2012
Ghost (Third Eye Foundation album), 1997
Ghosts (Albert Ayler album), 1965
Ghosts (Ash Riser album), 2017
Ghosts (Big Wreck album), 2014
Ghosts (Cowboy Junkies album), 2020
Ghosts (The Marked Men album), 2009
Ghosts (Monolake album), 2012
Ghosts (Rage album), 1999
Ghosts (Siobhán Donaghy album), 2007
Ghosts (Sleeping at Last album), 2003
Ghosts (Strawbs album), 1975
Ghosts (Techno Animal album), 1991
Ghosts (Wendy Matthews album), 1997
Ghosts, a series of albums by Nine Inch Nails
Ghosts I–IV, 2008 
Ghosts V: Together, 2020 
Ghosts VI: Locusts, 2020
The Ghost (Songs: Ohia album), 1999
The Ghost (Before the Dawn album), 2006

Songs
"Ghost" (Ella Henderson song), 2014
"Ghost" (Fefe Dobson song), 2010
"Ghost" (Gackt song), 2009
"Ghost" (Halsey song), 2015
"Ghost" (Jamie-Lee Kriewitz song), 2015
"Ghost" (Justin Bieber song), 2021
"Ghost" (Mystery Skulls song), 2013
"Ghost" (Phish song), 1998
"Ghost", by The 69 Eyes from Angels, 2007
"Ghost", by Ava Max from Diamonds & Dancefloors, 2023
"Ghost", by Beat Crusaders from EpopMAKING ~ Pop Tono Sogu ~, 2007
"Ghost", by Buckethead from Colma, 1998
"Ghost", by Clutch from Blast Tyrant, 2004
"Ghost", by Depeche Mode from Sounds of the Universe, 2009 
"Ghost", by Guttermouth from Full Length LP, 1991
"Ghost", by Hollywood Undead from Day of the Dead, 2015
"Ghost", by House of Heroes from The End Is Not the End, 2009
"Ghost", by Howie Day from Australia, 2000
"Ghost", by Indigo Girls from Rites of Passage, 1992
"Ghost", by Ingrid Michaelson from Human Again, 2011
"GHOST", a single by American rapper Jaden
"Ghost",  by Jes from Disconnect
"Ghost", by Katy Perry from Prism, 2013
"Ghost", by Little Boots from Hands, 2009
"Ghost", by Live from Secret Samadhi, 1997
"Ghost", by Mark Owen from The Art of Doing Nothing, 2013
"Ghost", by Mystery Skulls from Forever, 2014
"Ghost", by Neutral Milk Hotel from In the Aeroplane Over the Sea, 1998
"Ghost", by Pearl Jam from Riot Act, 2002
"Ghost", by Plastic Tree from Chandelier, 2005
"Ghost", by Sir Sly from Gold, 2013
"Ghost", by Skip the Use from Can Be Late, 2012
"Ghost", by Slash from Slash, 2010
"Ghost", by Sleeping with Sirens from How It Feels to Be Lost, 2019
"Ghost", by Tom Swoon, 2014
"Ghost", the first part of the 2013 song "Haunted" by Beyoncé
"Ghost", by Zoe Wees from Golden Wings, 2021
"GHOST!", by Kid Cudi from Man on the Moon II: The Legend of Mr. Rager, 2010
"Ghosts" (Bruce Springsteen song), 2020
"Ghosts" (Dirty Vegas song), 2002
"Ghosts" (Japan song), 1982
"Ghosts" (Laura Marling song), 2007
"Ghosts" (Michael Jackson song), 1997
"Ghosts", by 1 Giant Leap from 1 Giant Leap, 2002
"Ghosts", by Assemblage 23 from Meta, 2007
"Ghosts", by Albert Ayler from Spiritual Unity, 1965
"Ghosts", by Big Wreck from Ghosts, 2014
"Ghosts", by Caravan Palace from Chronologic, 2019
"Ghosts", by Funeral for a Friend from Memory and Humanity, 2008
"Ghosts", by Ghosts from The World Is Outside, 2007
"Ghosts", by The Jam from The Gift, 1982
"Ghosts", by Kansas from In the Spirit of Things, 1988
"Ghosts", by Ladytron from Velocifero, 2008
"Ghosts", by Mike Shinoda from Post Traumatic, 2018
"Ghosts", by The Presets from Pacifica, 2012
"Ghosts", by PVRIS from White Noise, 2014
"Ghosts", by Rage from Ghosts, 1999
"Ghosts", by Robbie Williams from Intensive Care, 2005
"Ghosts", by Shellac from 1000 Hurts, 2000
"Ghosts", by Susumu Hirasawa from Sword-Wind Chronicle BERSERK Original Soundtrack, 1997

Other music
Ghost, a piano trio by Beethoven
Ghost note, a type of musical note
Ghost the Musical, a 2011 stage musical

Television

Series
Ghosts (1995 British TV series), a BBC series
Ghost (2008 TV series), a Malaysian mystery series
Ghost (Korean TV series), 2012 police procedural series
Ghosts (2019 British TV series), a 2019 BBC sitcom
Ghosts (American TV series), a 2021 CBS sitcom based on BBC sitcom
Kamen Rider Ghost, a 2015–16 TV Asahi tokusatsu series

Episodes
"Ghost" (Dollhouse)
"Ghosts", an episode of Dark
"Ghosts" (Gotham)
"Ghosts" (Hidden Palms)
"Ghosts" (Justified)
"Ghosts", an episode of One Day at a Time
"Ghosts" (Person of Interest)
"Ghosts" (Psych)
"Ghosts", a season two episode of The Protector
"The Ghost" (Agents of S.H.I.E.L.D.)
"The Ghost" (Miracles)
Ghosts (The Walking Dead), an episode of the television series The Walking Dead

Other television
Ghosting (television), an unwanted image

Computing and technology
Ghost (blogging platform), blogging software built in JavaScript
Ghost (disk utility), a disk cloning program
Ghost (operating system), an operating system project
G.ho.st, an operating system
IAI Ghost, a rotary mini UAV

Science

Biology
Ghost cell, a necrotic cell that retains its cellular architecture but has no nucleus
Ghost lineage, an inferred phylogenetic lineage
Ghost population, an inferred statistical population

Physics
Ghost (physics), an unphysical state in quantum field theory
Faddeev–Popov ghost, a type of unphysical field in quantum field theory
Gemini High-resolution Optical Spectrograph (GHOST) a telescope instrument

Other uses
Ghost (fashion brand)
Ghost (mascot), a joke mainly used by sports fans in Latin America
Global horizontal sounding technique, an atmospheric field research project in the late 1960s
Juliet Marine Systems Ghost, a stealth ship
Rolls-Royce Ghost, a car

See also

Apparition (disambiguation)
Ghost in the machine (disambiguation)
Ghost boat (disambiguation)
Ghost Island (disambiguation)
Ghost pepper (Bhut jolokia)
Ghost Ship (disambiguation)
Ghost town (disambiguation)
Ghost train (disambiguation)
Ghosted (disambiguation)
Ghosting (disambiguation)
Ghostly (disambiguation)
Phantom (disambiguation)